This is a list of schools in the Royal Borough of Kensington and Chelsea in London, England.

State-funded schools

Primary schools 

ARK Brunel Primary Academy
Ashburnham Community School
Avondale Park Primary School
Barlby Primary School
Bevington Primary School
Bousfield Primary School
Christ Church CE Primary School
Colville Primary School
Fox Primary School
Holy Trinity CE Primary School
Kensington Primary Academy
Marlborough Primary School
Oratory RC Primary School
Our Lady of Victories RC Primary School
Oxford Gardens Primary School
Park Walk Primary School
St Barnabas' and St Philip's CE Primary School
St Charles RC Primary School
St Clement and St James CE Primary School
St Cuthbert with St Matthias CE Primary School
St Francis of Assisi RC Primary School
St Joseph's RC Primary School
St Mary Abbots CE Primary School
St Mary's RC Primary School
St Thomas' CE Primary School
Servite RC Primary School
Thomas Jones Primary School

Secondary schools 
All Saints Catholic College (RC, mixed)
Cardinal Vaughan Memorial School  (RC, boys)
Chelsea Academy (CE, mixed)
Holland Park School (mixed)
Kensington Aldridge Academy (mixed)
St Thomas More Language College (RC, mixed)

Special and alternative schools 
Chelsea Community Hospital School
Kensington Queensmill School
Parkwood Hall Co-operative Academy

Further education 
Kensington and Chelsea College
St Charles Catholic Sixth Form College

Independent schools

Primary and preparatory schools 

Bassett House School (non-selective, co-ed)
Cameron House School (non-selective, co-ed)
Chepstow House School (non-selective, co-ed)
Falkner House Girls' School (selective, girls)
Garden House School (non-selective, co-ed)
Glendower Preparatory School (selective, girls)
The Hampshire School, Chelsea (non-selective, co-ed)
Hawkesdown House School (non-selective, boys)
Hill House School (non-selective, co-ed)
Kensington Wade (non-selective, co-ed)
Knightsbridge School (non-selective, co-ed)
La Petite Ecole Francaise (non-selective, co-ed)
La Scuola Italiana A Londra (SIAL) (non-selective, co-ed)
Norland Place School (non-selective, co-ed)
Notting Hill Preparatory School (non-selective, co-ed)
Pembridge Hall School (non-selective, girls)
Redcliffe School (non-selective, co-ed)
St Philip's School (non-selective, boys)
The Stewart Bilingual School (non-selective, co-ed)
Sussex House School, (non-selective, boys)
Thomas's London Day Schools, (non-selective, co-ed)
Wetherby School (non-selective, boys)

Senior and all-through schools 

Ashbourne College (selective, co-ed)
Collingham College (selective, co-ed)
Instituto Español Vicente Cañada Blanch (non-selective, co-ed)
The Lloyd Williamson Schools (selective, co-ed)
Lycée Français Charles de Gaulle  (selective, co-ed)
Mander Portman Woodward  (selective, co-ed)
More House School (selective, girls)
Queen's Gate School  (selective, girls)
Russian Embassy School in London (non-selective, co-ed)
Southbank International School (selective, co-ed)
Tabernacle School (non-selective, co-ed)

Special and alternative schools 
Catch22 Pupil Parent Partnership
Epic Learning
Snowflake School

References

Kensington and Chelsea
Schools in the Royal Borough of Kensington and Chelsea